Vojtěch Petr (4 October 1955 – 8 April 2012) was a Czech basketball player. He competed in the men's tournament at the 1976 Summer Olympics.

See also
Czechoslovak Basketball League career stats leaders

References

External links
 

1955 births
2012 deaths
Czechoslovak men's basketball players
Olympic basketball players of Czechoslovakia
Basketball players at the 1976 Summer Olympics
Sportspeople from Brno
1974 FIBA World Championship players
1978 FIBA World Championship players
1982 FIBA World Championship players
Czech men's basketball players